The First Special Stakes was an American Thoroughbred horse race run between 1886 and 1909 at Gravesend Race Track in Gravesend, on Coney Island, New York. The race was run on dirt at a distance of one and one-quarter miles and was open to horses of either sex age three and older since 1887.

Historical notes
The 1886 inaugural running was for three-year-olds only and the one time it was raced at one and one-half miles. There were just two horses participating in the 1886 race won by Dewdrop who beat that year's Kentucky Derby winner Ben Ali.

In 1887, the race marked the beginning of an important event for older horses with the First Special Stakes attracting the top horses to such an extent that 14 of the 24 editions of the race were won by Champions. Fair Play, one of the non-champions who is best known today as the sire of Man o' War, won the 1908 running in track record time.

Demise of the First Special Stakes 
After years of uncertainty, on June 11, 1908, the Republican controlled New York Legislature under Governor Charles Evans Hughes passed the Hart–Agnew anti-betting legislation with penalties allowing for fines and up to a year in prison. The owners of Gravesend Race Track, and other racing facilities in New York State, struggled to stay in business without income from betting. Racetrack operators had no choice but to drastically reduce the purse money being paid out which resulted in the cancellation of the Second Special Stakes after 1907 so that limited funds could be used to maintain the purses offered for other high-profile races. Nonetheless for 1908 and 1909 the purse for the First Special Stakes was well less than half of what it had been. Further restrictive legislation was passed by the New York Legislature in 1910 which deepened the financial crisis for track operators and led to a complete shut down of racing across the state during 1911 and 1912. After a 1911 amendment to the law to limit the liability of owners and directors was defeated, every racetrack in New York State shut down. Owners, whose horses of racing age had nowhere to go, began sending them, their trainers and their jockeys to race in England and France. Many ended their racing careers there, and a number remained to become an important part of the European horse breeding industry. Thoroughbred Times reported that  more than 1,500 American horses were sent overseas between 1908 and 1913 and that of them, at least 24 were either past, present, or future Champions. When a February 21, 1913 ruling by the New York Supreme Court, Appellate Division ruling saw horse racing return in 1913 it was too late for the Gravesend horse racing facility never reopened.

Records
Speed record:
 1 1/4 miles : 2:03.40 - Fair Play (1908)

Most wins:
 3 - Kingston (1888, 1889, 1890)

Most wins by a jockey:
 3 - Isaac Burns Murphy (1887, 1888, 1889) & Willie Simms (1892, 1894, 1897)

Most wins by a trainer:
 3 - Frank McCabe (1886, 1888, 1889) & Hardy Campbell Jr. (1890, 1894, 1897)

Most wins by an owner:
 6 - Dwyer Brothers Stable / Michael F. Dwyer (1886, 1888, 1889, 1890, 1894, 1897)

Winners

Ŧ denotes a Champion.

References

Open middle distance horse races
Open mile category horse races
Discontinued horse races in New York City
Gravesend Race Track
Recurring sporting events established in 1886
Recurring sporting events disestablished in 1909
1886 establishments in New York (state)
1909 disestablishments in New York (state)